Charoen Sin is a district (amphoe) of Sakon Nakhon province, northeast Thailand.

Geography
Neighboring districts are (from the north clockwise) Ban Muang, Wanon Niwat and Sawang Daen Din of Sakon Nakhon Province, and Ban Dung of Udon Thani province.

History
The minor district (king amphoe) Charoen Sin was established on 15 February 1988, when five tambons were split off from Sawang Daen Din district. It was upgraded to a full district on 4 July 1994.

Administration
The district is divided into five sub-districts (tambons), which are further subdivided into 52 villages (mubans). The sub-district municipality (thesaban tambon) Charoen Sin covers parts of tambons Charoen Sin and Thung Kae. There are a further five tambon administrative organizations (TAO).

References

External links
amphoe.com

Charoen Sin